Sturtevant may refer to:

 Aaron Paul Sturtevant (born 1979), better known as Aaron Paul, American actor
 Albert D. Sturtevant (1894–1918), American naval officer
 Albert Morey Sturtevant (1876–1957), American academic of Scandinavian philology
 Alfred Sturtevant (1891–1970), American geneticist
 Butler Sturtevant (1899–1971), American landscape architect
 David Sturtevant Ruder (born 1929), American administrator and Professor of Law
 Edgar H. Sturtevant (1875–1952), American linguist
 Edward Lewis Sturtevant (1842–1898), American agronomist and botanist
 Elaine Sturtevant (1930–2014), American artist
 Grace Sturtevant, iris breeder
 Harold Sturtevant (born c1918), United States Navy sailor, known for tearing down Nazi flag
 John Cirby Sturtevant (1835–1912), American politician 
 Paul Allen Sturtevant (1898–1987), American inventor of the beam type torque wrench (1938) 
 William C. Sturtevant (1926–2007), American anthropologist
 Benjamin F. Sturtevant (1833–1890), American inventor of hot blast heating system (1869)

Sturtevant may also refer to:
 B. F. Sturtevant Company and its successors
 Sturtevant, Wisconsin, United States
 USS Sturtevant (DD-240), Clemson-class destroyer, 1920–1942
 USS Sturtevant (DE-239), Edsall-class destroyer escort, 1943–1960